Tylos is a genus of woodlice in the family Tylidae. There are at least 20 described species in Tylos. All the species in this family can roll up into a perfect ball and live on sandy beaches.

Species
These 27 species belong to the genus Tylos:

 Tylos africanus Ferrara, 1974 i
 Tylos albidus Budde-Lund, 1879 i c g
 Tylos australis Lewis & Bishop, 1990 i c g
 Tylos capensis Krauss, 1843 i c g
 Tylos chilensis Schultz, 1983 i c g
 Tylos cilicius Verhoeff, 1941 i
 Tylos europaeus Arcangeli, 1938 i c g
 Tylos exiguus Stebbing, 1910 i c g
 Tylos granulatus Krauss, 1843 i c g
 Tylos granuliferus Budde-Lund, 1885 i c g
 Tylos latreillei Audouin, 1826 i g
 Tylos madeirae Arcangeli, 1938 c g
 Tylos maindroni Giordani Soika, 1954 c g
 Tylos maindronii Soika, 1954 i
 Tylos marcuzzii Soika, 1954 i c g
 Tylos minor Dollfus, 1893 i c g
 Tylos neozelanicus Chilton, 1901 i c g
 Tylos niveus Budde-Lund, 1885 i c g
 Tylos nudulus Budde-Lund, 1906 i c g
 Tylos ochri Roman, 1977 i
 Tylos opercularis Budde-Lund, 1885 i c g
 Tylos ponticus Grebnitsky, 1874 i c g
 Tylos punctatus Holmes & Gay, 1909 i c g b
 Tylos sardous Arcangeli, 1938 i
 Tylos spinulosus Dana, 1853 i c g
 Tylos tantabiddy Lewis, 1991 i c g
 Tylos wegeneri Vandel, 1952 i c g

Data sources: i = ITIS, c = Catalogue of Life, g = GBIF, b = Bugguide.net

References

External links

 

Woodlice
Isopod genera
Taxa named by Pierre André Latreille
Articles created by Qbugbot